The 2020 Four Continents Figure Skating Championships were held on February 4–9, 2020 in Seoul, South Korea. Held annually since 1999, the competition featured skaters from the Americas, Asia, Africa, and Oceania. Medals were awarded in the disciplines of men's singles, ladies' singles, pairs, and ice dance.

Qualification

Age and minimum TES requirements
The competition is open to skaters from all non-European member nations of the International Skating Union. The corresponding competition for European skaters is the 2020 European Figure Skating Championships.

Skaters are eligible for the 2020 Four Continents Championships if they turned 15 years of age before July 1, 2019 and have met the minimum technical elements score requirements. The ISU accepts scores if they were obtained at senior-level ISU-recognized international competitions at least 21 days before the first official practice day of the championships.

Number of entries per discipline
Each qualifying member nation may have up to three entries per discipline.

Schedule

Entries
Member nations began announcing their selections in December 2019. The International Skating Union published a complete list of entries on January 16, 2020.

Changes to preliminary assignments

Medal summary

Medalists
Medals awarded to the skaters who achieve the highest overall placements in each discipline:

Small medals awarded to the skaters who achieve the highest short program or rhythm dance placements in each discipline:

Medals awarded to the skaters who achieve the highest free skating or free dance placements in each discipline:

Medals by country 
Table of medals for overall placement:

Table of small medals for placement in the short/rhythm segment:

Table of small medals for placement in the free segment:

Records 

The following new ISU best scores were set during this competition:

Results

Men

Ladies

Pairs

Ice dance

References

External links
 2020 Four Continents Championships at the International Skating Union
 Official website

Four Continents Figure Skating Championships
Four Continents Figure Skating Championships
Four Continents Figure Skating Championships
Four Continents Figure Skating
Four Continents Figure Skating Championships
Four Continents Figure Skating Championships